François-André Danican Philidor (7 September 1726 – 31 August 1795), often referred to as André Danican Philidor during his lifetime, was a French composer and chess player. He contributed to the early development of the opéra comique. He is widely regarded as the best chess player of his age; his book Analyse du jeu des Échecs was considered a standard chess manual for at least a century. A well-known chess opening, an endgame position, and a checkmate method are all named after him.

Musical family
François-André Danican Philidor came from the well-known musical Philidor family. The original name of his family was Danican, but François-André's grandfather, Jean Danican Philidor, was given the nickname of Philidor by Louis XIII because his oboe playing reminded the king of an Italian virtuoso oboist named Filidori.

Music career

Philidor joined the royal choir of Louis XV in 1732 at the age of 6, and made his first attempt at the composition of a song at the age of 11. It was said that Louis XV wanted to listen to the choir almost every day, and the singers, while waiting for the king to arrive, played chess to relieve their boredom; this may have sparked Philidor's interest in chess.

Starting in about 1740, he lived and worked in Paris as a performer, teacher and music copyist. He was the teacher of the Bohemian composer and pianist Ludwig Wenzel Lachnith. During this time he met Diderot, who called him 'Philidor le subtil' in Le neveu de Rameau. He spent much of the period 1745–1754 in London after a concert tour of the Netherlands collapsed, and moved in the same circles as Dr Johnson and Dr Burney. He returned to the French capital in 1754, resolving to devote himself seriously to musical composition, although his music was found by some to be too Italianate (as a result of his travels). However he scored several triumphs at the fair theatres, starting with Blaise le savetier in 1759. His three most successful works were Le sorcier (1764), Tom Jones (after Henry Fielding, 1765), and Ernelinde, princesse de Norvège (1767).

For a time Philidor was among the leading opera composers in France, and during his musical career produced over 20 opéras comiques and two tragédies-lyriques. He also wrote secular cantatas and motets.

Philidor also wrote music for masonic rituals. The first performance of his Carmen Saeculare was performed at Freemasons' Hall in London in 1779. He was a member of the renowned Parisian Lodge Les Neuf Soeurs. This Lodge had an allied society for musicians, called the Société Apollonienne.

Chess career

Philidor started playing regularly around 1740 at the chess Mecca of France, the Café de la Régence. It was also there that he famously played with a friend from New England, Benjamin Franklin. The best player in France at the time, Legall de Kermeur, taught him. At first, Legall could give Philidor rook odds, a handicap in which the stronger player starts without one of his rooks, but in only three years, Philidor equaled and then surpassed him.

Philidor visited England in 1747 and decisively beat the Syrian Philipp Stamma in a match, although Philidor let Stamma have the first move in every game and scored all draws as wins for Stamma. The same year, Philidor played many games with another strong player, Sir Abraham Janssen, who was then the best player in England, and with the exception of Legall, probably the best player Philidor ever encountered. He could win on an average one game in four from Philidor at even terms, and Philidor himself declared that he could only give to Janssen one-pawn odds in exchange for making the first move with the white pieces.

In 1754, Philidor returned to France, after nine years of absence, spent mostly in the Netherlands and England. He was now a much stronger player, having successfully played opponents of the calibre of Philip Stamma and Abraham Janssen, but, as G. Allen reports in The life of Philidor, it was not until his match with Legall (also known as de Legal) in 1755 that he can be considered the strongest player in the world.

When Philidor left Paris, in 1745, although he had for some time been playing even games with M. de Legal ... he had not ceased to recognize his old master as still his master and superior. But nine years of practice, with a great variety of players, had authorized him to look for neither superior nor equal; and when, in 1755, a match was arranged between the pupil and his master, who was still at the height of his strength, the result placed the crown firmly and indisputably upon the head of Philidor.

In 1771 and 1773, Philidor briefly stayed in London to play at the Salopian coffee house, Charing Cross and at the St. James Chess Club. In 1774, Parloe's chess club, on St. James Street in London, was created, and Philidor obtained remuneration as a chess master every year for a regular season from February to June. Philidor stayed faithful to this agreement until the end of his life, and he was replaced by Verdoni only after his death. Here, Philidor encountered George Atwood, a famous mathematician, physician and lecturer at Cambridge University. In an article by J. J. O'Connor and E. F. Robertson, devoted to George Atwood, there is the following passage: "Atwood was a renowned amateur chess-player and among other opponents played games against the famous French player Philidor, who was regarded as the unofficial world champion."

Henry Bird records:
Of the players who encountered Philidor, Sir Abraham Janssens, who died in 1775, seems to have been the best. Atwood, one of Pitt's secretaries, came next; he was of a class which we should call third or two grades of odds below Philidor, a high standard of excellence to which but few amateurs attained. One of the most interesting features of Atwood as a chess player is that he recorded and preserved some of his games, an unusual practice at that time. These records have survived, among them the last games that Philidor played, which were against Atwood at Parsloe's Club in London on 20 June 1795.

In England, Philidor astounded his peers by playing three blindfold chess games simultaneously in the chess club of St. James Street on 9 May 1783. Philidor let all three opponents play white, and gave up a pawn to the third player. Some affidavits were signed, because those persons who were involved doubted that future generations would believe that such a feat was possible. Today, three simultaneous blindfold games would be fairly unremarkable among many chess masters. Even when he was 67 years old, he played and won two blindfold games simultaneously in London in 1793.

Philidor, both in England and France, was largely recognized in each of his fields and had a lot of admirers, protectors and friends, such as the French philosophers Voltaire, Rousseau and the famous English actor David Garrick (1717–1779).

In December 1792, however, when he was 65, Philidor was forced to leave France for England. He fled the French Revolution (1789–1799) because his name was on the Revolutionary banishment list, established by the Convention nationale. This was not probably due to his ideas (indeed it seems Philidor was rather reserved about his opinions apart from music and chess), but very likely in view of the traditional attachment of his family to the King's family service.

Andrew Soltis writes that Philidor "was the best player in the world for 50 years. In fact, he was probably about 200 rating points better than anyone else yet alive—set apart by the mysteries of the game he had solved."

Also interesting is GM Boris Alterman's opinion on Philidor's play:
Five hundred years ago, chess was different from today. Pawns didn't cost as much as they do today. The best players started games with the gambits. Pawns were only a small price to: Open a file or diagonal; Create an immediate attack on an opponent's king. It was the Italian style of chess. All positions of the King's Gambit were very popular. ... The best chess player of his day was Francois Andre Danican-Philidor. ... His published chess strategy stood for a hundred years without significant addition or modification. He preached the value of a strong pawn center, an understanding of the relative value of the pieces, and correct pawn formations. ...

In the same article, Alterman also noticed, analyzing the game Count Brühl–Philidor, F, London 1783, that Philidor understood very well modern concepts like the power of passed pawns, bad and good pieces, space advantage, open files, pawn structure and the importance of center.

Jacques François Mouret, one of the best French players of the early 19th century, was Philidor's great-nephew.

l'Analyse du jeu des Échecs

In 1749, Philidor published his famous book Analyse du jeu des Échecs. He printed a second edition in 1777 and a third in 1790. The book was such an advance in chess knowledge that, by 1871, it had gone through about 70 editions and had been translated into English, Spanish, German, Russian and Italian. In it, Philidor analyzed nine different types of game openings. Most of the openings of Philidor are designed to strengthen and establish a strong defensive center using pawns. He is the first one to realize the new role of the pawn in the chess game, and his most famous advice was the saying "The pawns are the soul of chess."
More precisely Philidor said:
Mon but principal est de me rendre recommandable par une nouveauté dont personne ne s'est avisé, ou peut-être n'a été capable ; c'est celle de bien jouer les pions ; ils sont l'âme des Echecs : ce sont eux-mêmes qui forment uniquement l'attaque et la défense et de leur bon ou mauvais arrangement dépend entièrement le gain ou la perte de la partie.
Translation: My main purpose is to gain recognition for myself by means of a new idea of which no one has conceived, or perhaps has been unable to practice; that is, good play of the pawns; they are the soul of chess: it is they alone that determine the attack and the defense, and the winning or losing of the game depends entirely on their good or bad arrangement.
He also included analysis of certain positions of rook and bishop versus rook, such analysis being still current theory even today. He demonstrated an important drawing technique with a rook and pawn versus rook endgame in what is known as the Philidor position. The Philidor Defense (1.e4 e5 2.Nf3 d6) is named for him.  Philidor's book was the very first to give detailed annotations on how to play the middlegame, present chess strategy as a whole, and present the concepts of the blockade, prophylaxis, positional sacrifice and mobility of the pawn formation.

Early critics of the Analyse du jeu des Échecs include those of the Modenese School (Ercole del Rio, Lolli or Ponziani), who in contrast to the French, advocated a free piece play, gambit openings and tactical complications; they also found some of the variations reported in the Analyse to be unsound (in particular those related with ...f7–f5 push in the Philidor Defence: 1.e4 e5 2.Nf3 d6 3.d4 f5).  Some of Philidor's disciples—Bernard, Carlier, Leger, and Verdoni, who met at the Café de la Régence under the name of the Société des Amateurs—also criticized his work.  In their book, Traité des Amateurs, they expressed many criticisms and comments on his earlier printed book, arguing that the variations reported in Philidor's Analyse are more instructive than correct.  Nevertheless, the games in the Traité can be regarded, together of those of Philidor, as typical examples of the understanding of chess during the Enlightenment, and the Société des Amateurs was much closer to Philidor than to the Modenese school.

Notable games 
Captain Smith vs. François André Philidor, London, England 1790, Bishop's Opening: Berlin Defense (C24), . A good sample of Philidor's ideas about pawns; plus a nice mating  at the end.
François André Philidor vs "The Turk"

Final years
Philidor was stuck in England when the French Revolution occurred. Because of many of his social connections mentioned above, the Revolutionary Government put him on the banned list. He died on 31 August 1795 in London, and was buried in St James, Piccadilly. A few days later, his relatives succeeded in getting his name removed from the list.

Chess topics named after him
Philidor's name is used for three well-known chess topics:
The Philidor Defence, an opening he advocated;
Philidor's Legacy, a type of smothered mate (in fact invented centuries before Philidor);
Philidor's position, several endgame positions.

Battez Philidor!
A one-act opéra-comique with music by Amédée Dutacq and libretto by Abraham Dreyfus entitled Battez Philidor ! (Beat Philidor!) was premiered on 13 November 1882 at the Opéra-Comique. Set in 1777, a poor musician is required to beat Philidor at chess before he can win the hand of his sweetheart. Although Philidor agrees to lose the match to help out, by distraction he nonetheless wins the game, although all turns out well for the lovers in the end. Battez Philidor ! also features Philidor's sometime collaborator A A H Poinsinet.

Works

Notes

References
 World Chess Champions by Edward G. Winter, editor. 1981 
 Life of Philidor: Musician and Chess-Player by George Allen, Tassilo von Heydebrand und der Lasa; Da Capo Press; 1971. 
 The World's Great Chess Games by Reuben Fine; Dover; 1983.

External links

 
  
 
     Philidor at Res musica 
 Philidor at mjae.com 
 Analyse du jeu des échecs (1777 edition, London) at Google Books. 
 Analysis of the game of chess (1790 English edition, London) at Google Books.
 "Philidor: 'Pawns are the soul of chess'" by Edward Winter
 Edward Winter's "François-André Danican Philidor" (Chess Notes Feature Article)

18th-century classical composers
French chess players
French Classical-period composers
French male classical composers
French opera composers
Male opera composers
People from Dreux
1726 births
1795 deaths
18th-century chess players
18th-century French writers
18th-century French male writers
French chess writers
Chess theoreticians
Chess composers
French people of Scottish descent
Composers of masonic music
French male non-fiction writers
18th-century French composers
18th-century French male musicians
Sportspeople from Eure-et-Loir